Chris Lewis-Harris (born February 11, 1989) is a former American football cornerback. He was signed by the Cincinnati Bengals as an undrafted free agent in 2012. He has also been a member of the Baltimore Ravens, Denver Broncos, and New York Giants. He played college football at Tennessee-Chattanooga.

High school career
Lewis-Harris attended Campbell High School in Smyrna, Georgia. He was selected to the Associated Press first-team All-State as a defensive back. He was also named for Cobb County Defensive Back of the Year.

College career
Lewis-Harris was an All-conference defensive back while at Tennessee-Chattanooga. He played 44 games and started 38 of them as a Cornerback and Safety.

Professional career

Cincinnati Bengals
On July 26, 2012, Lewis-Harris signed with the Cincinnati Bengals as an undrafted free agent. On August 31, 2012, he was released.  On September 1, 2012, he was signed to the practice squad.  On September 29, he was promoted to the active roster after the team waived tight end Richard Quinn.  On October 2, 2012, he was waived after the team re-signed tight end Richard Quinn.  On October 4, 2012 he was re-signed to the practice squad.  On December 28, 2012, he was promoted to the active roster after the team placed Mike Nugent on Injured reserve due to a calf injury.

On December 5, 2015, Lewis-Harris was waived by the Cincinnati Bengals. On December 8, 2015, the Cincinnati Bengals signed Harris to their practice squad. On December 24, 2015, he was promoted to the active roster.

On November 3, 2016, Lewis-Harris was released by the Bengals.

Baltimore Ravens
On November 4, 2016, Lewis-Harris was claimed off waivers by the Baltimore Ravens.

Denver Broncos
On June 14, 2017, Lewis-Harris signed with the Denver Broncos. He was released on September 2, 2017.

New York Giants
On May 13, 2018, Lewis-Harris signed with the New York Giants. He was released on September 1, 2018.

References

External links
 Tennessee-Chattanooga bio
 Cincinnati Bengals bio

1989 births
Living people
American football cornerbacks
Chattanooga Mocs football players
Cincinnati Bengals players
Baltimore Ravens players
Denver Broncos players
New York Giants players